Carl August Berthold Schuhmann (12 May 1869 – 24 March 1946) was a German athlete who won four Olympic titles in gymnastics and wrestling at the 1896 Summer Olympics in Athens, becoming the most successful athlete at the inaugural Olympics of the modern era. He also competed in weightlifting.

Biography
Schuhmann, who was a member of the Berliner Turnerschaft, was a member of the successful German gymnastics team that won the team events in the horizontal bar and parallel bars events. Schuhmann added a third title by winning the horse vault event. He also competed in the parallel bars, horizontal bar, pommel horse, and rings events without success. The only extant information about his placing in those events, besides not being a medallist, is that he placed fifth in the rings competition.

Schuhmann then entered the wrestling competition, which he also won, even though he was much lighter and smaller than most of the other combatants. In the first round, he faced Launceston Elliot of Great Britain and Ireland, who had won the weightlifting competition. Schuhmann won easily. The semifinals resulted in a bye for the German. In the final, he faced Georgios Tsitas of Greece. The match went for 40 minutes before it was determined that it was too dark to continue and the bout was postponed until a second day. The next morning, Schuhmann quickly finished the bout with a win for a gold medal.

He also entered the weightlifting competition, placing fourth.

Schuhmann was one of nine athletes to compete in the long jump. The only information known about his placing in the event is that he was not one of the top four. He also placed fifth in the triple jump and in the bottom three of a seven-man field in the shot put.

Schuhmann tied for fourth place in the two-handed weightlifting competition now known as the clean and jerk. He and Georgios Papasideris of Greece both lifted 90.0 kilograms.

In 1936, he was part of a gymnastics exhibition at the Olympic Stadium.

His tombstone at Friedhof Heerstraße is inscribed with the five Olympic Rings, the epitaph "Germany’s first Olympic champion", and the legend "Athens 1896".

See also
List of multiple Olympic gold medalists at a single Games

References

External links

1869 births
1946 deaths
Sportspeople from Münster
Athletes (track and field) at the 1896 Summer Olympics
19th-century sportsmen
Gymnasts at the 1896 Summer Olympics
Weightlifters at the 1896 Summer Olympics
Wrestlers at the 1896 Summer Olympics
German male sport wrestlers
Olympic athletes of Germany
Olympic gymnasts of Germany
Olympic weightlifters of Germany
Olympic wrestlers of Germany
German male triple jumpers
German male long jumpers
German male shot putters
German male artistic gymnasts
German male weightlifters
Olympic gold medalists for Germany
Olympic medalists in gymnastics
Olympic medalists in wrestling
Medalists at the 1896 Summer Olympics
People associated with physical culture